Sir Collin Fonotau Tukuitonga  (born ) is a Niuean-born New Zealand doctor, public health academic, public policy expert and advocate for reducing health inequalities of Māori and Pasifika people. He has held several positions in public health and government in New Zealand and internationally.

Early life and education 
Tukuitonga was born and raised in Niue. He completed his medical degree in Fiji, followed by a master's degree in public health in Sydney.

Name 
Tukuitonga's first name was spelt 'Colin' for many years but as of 2022 he reverted to its original spelling with a double 'l'.

Career 
Tukuitonga was Chief Executive of the Ministry of Pacific Island Affairs, Director of Public Health for the Ministry of Health and also Coordinator of Surveillance of Noncommunicable Diseases for the World Health Organization (WHO) based in Geneva. From 2014 to 2020 he was Director-General of the Secretariat of the Pacific Community. In 2018 he was nominated by the New Zealand government to be the Regional Director of the Western Pacific Region of the World Health Organisation however he did not gain the position.

In 2020 Tukuitonga was appointed as inaugural Associate Dean Pacific at the Health and Medical Sciences faculty of the University of Auckland.

Honours and awards 

Tukuitonga was appointed a Knight Companion of the New Zealand Order of Merit, for services to Pacific and public health, in the 2022 Queen's Birthday and Platinum Jubilee Honours.

Selected publications

References 

New Zealand public health doctors
Living people
Knights Companion of the New Zealand Order of Merit
Academic staff of the University of Auckland
Niuean knights
1950s births
People from Alofi